Hattendorf a German surname that is classified as being of habitation origin.  Habitation names are those family names which are derived from either the location or the town or place of residence of the initial bearer or from the name of the town or village from whence he hailed. Hattendorf can be traced back to 1547.  The origin of the family name Hattendorf is Germany. Notable people with the surname include:

 John B. Hattendorf (born 1941), American navel historian

See also

Academia 

 Hattendorf Prize, an academic award for research in maritime history named for John B. Hattendorf
 Hattendorff's theorem, a theorem in actuarial science

Places 

 Hattendorf, a place in Auetal, Schaumburg, Germany
 Hattendorf, a village in Alsfeld, Vogelbergkreis, Germany

German-language surnames